Alexander Salvador Perez (born March 21, 1992) is an American mixed martial artist and currently competes in flyweight division of the Ultimate Fighting Championship (UFC). As of December 6, 2022, he is #6 in the UFC flyweight rankings.

Background 
Perez is of Mexican descent and has eight siblings. He started wrestling in the sixth grade alongside his two brothers Silverio Esparza and Julian Perez. Perez represent West Hills College Lemoore in wrestling and he was the regional champion and All-American wrestler in his sophomore year in college.
After Perez completed high school, he began helping friends train for their MMA fights due to his wrestling experience.

Mixed martial arts career

Early career 
Perez fought all of his fights in United States where he made his professional debut on May 6, 2011, at TPF 9. He faced Jesus Castro and knockout Castro in round one. He amassed a total of 16-4 before joining Dana White's Contender Series 5, facing Kevin Gray. He defeated Gray, and with the win, he was signed by UFC.

Ultimate Fighting Championship 

Perez made his promotional debut on December 9, 2017, at UFC Fight Night: Swanson vs. Ortega against Carlos John de Tomas. He won the fight via submission in round two.

On February 24, 2018, Perez faced Eric Shelton at UFC on Fox: Emmett vs. Stephens. At the weigh-ins,  Perez weighed in at 126.5 pounds, a half pound over the flyweight non-title fight upper limit of 126 pounds. As a result, the bout proceeded at catchweight and Perez was fined 20% of his purse which went to Shelton. He won the fight via unanimous decision.

Perez faced Jose Torres on August 9, 2018, at UFC 227.  He won the fight via knockout in round one.

Perez faced Joseph Benavidez on November 30, 2018, at The Ultimate Fighter 28 Finale. He lost the fight via technical knockout out in round one.

Perez faced Mark De La Rosa in a bantamweight bout on March 30, 2019, at UFC on ESPN 2. He won the fight via unanimous decision.

Perez was scheduled to face Sergio Pettis on September 21, 2019, at UFC Fight Night 159. However, Perez pulled out of the bout on August 26 citing an injury.

Perez faced Jordan Espinosa on January 25, 2020, at UFC Fight Night 166. He won the fight via an arm-triangle choke in round one. This win earned him the Performance of the Night award.
Perez's arm triangle was an on the fly adjustment and the first time he had submitted someone from that position.

Perez was expected to face Kai Kara-France on May 16, 2020. However, on April 9, Dana White, the president of UFC announced that the event would be postponed to a future date due to the COVID-19 pandemic. Instead Perez faced Jussier Formiga on June 6, 2020, at UFC 250. He won the fight via first-round technical knockout. This win earned him the Performance of the Night.

Perez was expected to face Brandon Moreno on November 21, 2020, at UFC 255. However, on October 2, it was announced that  Perez would face Deiveson Figueiredo, replacing an injured Cody Garbrandt for the UFC Flyweight Championship at the same event. He lost the fight via guillotine choke submission in round one.

Perez was scheduled to meet Matt Schnell on May 15, 2021, at UFC 262. However, for undisclosed reasons Perez was forced to pull out from the event and was replaced by Rogério Bontorin.

Perez was scheduled to face Askar Askarov on July 31, 2021, on UFC on ESPN: Hall vs. Strickland. However, Askarov pulled out of the fight in early July citing injury. In turn, Perez was removed from the card entirely and rescheduled to face Matt Schnell four weeks later on August 28, 2021, at UFC on ESPN: Barboza vs. Chikadze. However, for undisclosed reasons, the bout was moved to UFC Fight Night: Brunson vs. Till. However, the bout was yet again moved for unknown reasons to UFC 269. At the weigh-ins, Alex Perez weighed in at 126.25 pounds, a quarter-pound over the flyweight non-title fight limit. Shortly after the weigh-ins, officials had announced that the bout had been canceled due to Schnell withdrawing from the event because of a medical issue. The pair was rescheduled to UFC 271 on February 12, 2022. At weigh-ins, Perez came in at 128 pounds and did not attempt to try again, resulting in Matt Schnell refusing to  accept the catchweight bout and the fight being canceled.

Perez faced Alexandre Pantoja on July 30, 2022, at UFC 277. He lost the fight via a neck crank submission early in the first round.

Perez was scheduled to face Amir Albazi on December 17, 2022, at UFC Fight Night 216. However, he pulled out due to undisclosed reasons in late October and was replaced by Brandon Royval.

Perez was scheduled to face Kai Kara-France on February 12, 2023, at UFC 284. However, Kara-France withdrew from the fight, citing a knee injury and the bout was canceled.

Perez is scheduled to face Manel Kape on March 25, 2023, at UFC on ESPN 43.

Personal life
Alex and his wife have a son (born 2021).

Championships and accomplishments

Mixed martial arts
Ultimate Fighting Championship
 Performance of the Night (Two times) 
 Tachi Palace
 Tachi Palace Flyweight Champion (one time; former)

Mixed martial arts record 

|-
|Loss
|align=center|24–7
|Alexandre Pantoja
|Submission (neck crank)
|UFC 277
|
|align=center|1
|align=center|1:31
|Dallas, Texas, United States
|
|-
|Loss
|align=center|24–6
|Deiveson Figueiredo 
|Submission (guillotine choke)
|UFC 255
|
|align=center|1
|align=center|1:57
|Las Vegas, Nevada, United States
|
|-
|Win
|align=center|24–5
|Jussier Formiga
|TKO (leg kicks)
|UFC 250
|
|align=center|1
|align=center|4:06
|Las Vegas, Nevada, United States
|
|-
|Win
|align=center|23–5
|Jordan Espinosa
|Technical Submission (arm-triangle choke)
|UFC Fight Night: Blaydes vs. dos Santos 
|
|align=center|1
|align=center|2:33
|Raleigh, North Carolina, United States
|
|-
|Win
|align=center|22–5
|Mark De La Rosa
|Decision (unanimous)
|UFC on ESPN: Barboza vs. Gaethje 
|
|align=center|3
|align=center|5:00
|Philadelphia, Pennsylvania, United States
|
|-
|Loss
|align=center|21–5
|Joseph Benavidez
|TKO (punches)
|The Ultimate Fighter: Heavy Hitters Finale 
|
|align=center|1
|align=center|4:21
|Las Vegas, Nevada, United States
|
|- 
| Win
| align=center| 21–4
| Jose Torres
| KO (punches)
| UFC 227
| 
| align=center| 1
| align=center| 3:34
| Los Angeles, California, United States
|
|-
| Win
| align=center| 20–4
| Eric Shelton
| Decision (unanimous)
| UFC on Fox: Emmett vs. Stephens
| 
| align=center| 3
| align=center| 5:00
| Orlando, Florida, United States
|
|-
| Win
| align=center| 19–4
| Carls John de Tomas
| Submission (anaconda choke)
| UFC Fight Night: Swanson vs. Ortega
| 
| align=center| 2
| align=center| 1:54
| Fresno, California, United States
|
|-
| Win
| align=center| 18–4
| Kevin Gray
| Technical Submission (anaconda choke)
| Dana White's Contender Series 5
| 
| align=center| 1
| align=center| 2:54
| Las Vegas, Nevada, United States
|
|-
| Win
| align=center| 17–4
| Tyler Bialecki
| Decision (unanimous)
| CFFC 64
| 
| align=center| 3
| align=center| 5:00
| San Diego, California, United States
|
|-
| Win
| align=center| 16–4
| Andrew Natividad
| Submission (anaconda choke)
| TPF 30
| 
| align=center| 1
| align=center| 2:27
| Lemoore, California, United States
|
|-
| Win
| align=center| 15–4
| Ralph Acosta
| Decision (unanimous)
| KOTC: Warranted Aggression
| 
| align=center| 3
| align=center| 5:00
| Ontario, California, United States
|
|-
| Win
| align=center| 14–4
| Ray Elizalde
| Decision (split)
| RFA 42
| 
| align=center| 3
| align=center| 5:00
| Visalia, California, United States
|
|-
| Loss
| align=center| 13–4
| Jared Papazian
| Submission (armbar)
| TPF 27
| 
| align=center| 1
| align=center| 3:26
| Lemoore, California, United States
|
|-
| Loss
| align=center| 13–3
| Adam Antolin
| Submission (guillotine choke)
| TPF 25
| 
| align=center| 1
| align=center| 1:15
| Lemoore, California, United States
|
|-
| Win
| align=center| 13–2
| Martin Sandoval
| Decision (unanimous) 
| TPF 24
| 
| align=center| 3
| align=center| 5:00
| Lemoore, California, United States
|
|-
| Win
| align=center| 12–2
| Anthony Figueroa
| Decision (unanimous)
| TPF 22
| 
| align=center| 5
| align=center| 5:00
| Lemoore, California, United States
|
|-
| Win
| align=center| 11–2
| Del Hawkins
| TKO (punches)
| TPF 19
| 
| align=center| 1
| align=center| 2:23
| Lemoore, California, United States
|
|-
| Win
| align=center| 10–2
| Eloy Garza
| Decision (unanimous)
| TPF 18
| 
| align=center| 3
| align=center| 5:00
| Lemoore, California, United States
|
|-
| Win
| align=center| 9–2
| Jeff Carson
| Submission (standing guillotine)
| TPF 16
| 
| align=center| 1
| align=center| 2:23
| Lemoore, California, United States
|
|-
| Win
| align=center| 8–2
| Peter Baltimore
| Decision (unanimous)
| MEZ Sports: Pandemonium 8
| 
| align=center| 3
| align=center| 5:00
| Pomona, California, United States
|
|-
| Win
| align=center| 7–2
| Carlos DeSoto
| TKO (punches)
| TPF 15
| 
| align=center| 1
| align=center| 1:52
| Lemoore, California, United States
|
|-
| Win
| align=center| 6–2
| Javier Galas
| Submission (rear-naked choke)
| TPF 14
| 
| align=center| 1
| align=center| 1:37
| Lemoore, California, United States
|
|-
| Win
| align=center| 5–2
| Edgar Diaz
| Submission (kimura)
| TPF 12
| 
| align=center| 1
| align=center| 2:33
| Lemoore, California, United States
|
|-
| Win
| align=center| 4–2
| Kevin Michel
| Decision (unanimous)
| CA Fight Syndicate: Rivalry
| 
| align=center| 3
| align=center| 5:00
| Santa Monica, California, United States
|
|-
| Loss
| align=center| 3–2
| John MaCalolooy
| Decision (unanimous)
| WFC: Bruvado Bash
| 
| align=center| 3
| align=center| 5:00
| Placerville, California, United States
|
|-
| Loss
| align=center| 3–1
| Edgar Diaz
| Submission (guillotine choke)
| TPF 11
| 
| align=center| 1
| align=center| 0:43
| Lemoore, California, United States
|
|-
| Win
| align=center| 3–0
| Sam Stevens-Milo
|  Decision (unanimous)
| UPC Unlimited: Up & Comers 6 
| 
| align=center| 3
| align=center| 5:00
| Turlock, California, United States
|
|-
| Win
| align=center| 2–0
| Ruben Trujillo
| Decision (unanimous)
| UPC Unlimited: Up & Comers 4
| 
| align=center| 3
| align=center| 5:00
| Madera, California, United States
|
|-
| Win
| align=center| 1–0
| Jesus Castro
| TKO (punches)
| TPF 9
| 
| align=center| 1
| align=center| 1:56
| Lemoore, California, United States
|
|-

See also 
 List of current UFC fighters
 List of male mixed martial artists

References

External links 

 
 

Living people
1992 births
American male mixed martial artists
Flyweight mixed martial artists
Mixed martial artists utilizing collegiate wrestling
Mixed martial artists utilizing boxing
Mixed martial artists utilizing Brazilian jiu-jitsu
American male sport wrestlers
Amateur wrestlers
American practitioners of Brazilian jiu-jitsu
Ultimate Fighting Championship male fighters